Guilherme Bitencourt da Silva (born 12 March 1994), commonly known as Guilherme Biteco, is a Brazilian footballer who currently plays as an attacking midfielder for São José.

References

External links

1994 births
Living people
Brazilian footballers
Brazilian expatriate footballers
Association football midfielders
Footballers from Porto Alegre
Campeonato Brasileiro Série A players
Campeonato Brasileiro Série B players
Grêmio Foot-Ball Porto Alegrense players
CR Vasco da Gama players
TSG 1899 Hoffenheim players
Santa Cruz Futebol Clube players
Clube Náutico Capibaribe players
Ceará Sporting Club players
Paraná Clube players
Associação Desportiva São Caetano players
Oeste Futebol Clube players
FC Cascavel players
Rio Branco Sport Club players
Esporte Clube São José players
Brazilian expatriate sportspeople in Germany
Expatriate footballers in Germany